Mica Dam is a hydroelectric embankment dam spanning the Columbia River 135 kilometres north of Revelstoke, British Columbia, Canada. It was built as one of three Canadian projects under the terms of the 1964 Columbia River Treaty and is operated by BC Hydro. Completed in 1973, the Mica powerhouse had an original generating capacity of 1,805 megawatts (MW). Mica Dam, named after the nearby settlement of Mica Creek and its associated stream, in turn named after the abundance of mica minerals in the area, is one of the largest earthfill dams in the world. The reservoir created by the dam is Kinbasket Lake. Water from the dam flows south directly into Revelstoke Lake, the reservoir for the Revelstoke Dam. Mica Dam is the tallest dam in Canada and second tallest in North America after the Chicoasén Dam in Mexico and it is the farthest upstream dam on the Columbia River. The dam's underground powerhouse was the second largest in the world at the time of its construction, and was the first 500 kV installation of sulphur hexafluoride (SF6) insulated switchgear in the world.

History 
Mica Dam was constructed by BC Hydro as part of three projects, along with Duncan Dam and Arrow Dam, required under the Columbia River Treaty, ratified in 1964. Construction began in 1967, and was completed on March 23, 1973.

Mica Dam was operational on March 29, 1973.

In 1976, the first two electrical generators were commissioned, and in 1977 two more were completed bringing the total capacity of the powerhouse to 1,805 MW. Another two 500 MW generators were added and became operational in 2014 and in 2015, giving a total generating capacity of 2,805 MW.

The Mica powerhouse delivers its power to Nicola Substation via a 500-kilovolt,  transmission line.  A second power transmission line was built to the Meridian Substation near Port Moody, British Columbia, Canada.

The creation of Kinbasket Lake submerged parts of the Big Bend Country, a subregion of the Columbia Country. This included a number of small communities along the Big Bend Highway, and the eastern section of that route. Also, the Canadian Pacific Railway (CP) line ran along the Columbia Valley from Donald to Beavermouth. Consequently, west of Donald, CP diverted the line to a higher elevation, which required constructing four new bridges and a  tunnel.

Mica Dam was built to provide  of water storage as outlined in the Columbia River Treaty, plus another , referred to as "non-Treaty storage". Since 1977, BC Hydro and the Bonneville Power Administration (BPA) have made a series of long and short term agreements for using non-Treaty storage. Negotiations for a new long-term agreement began in 2011. If implemented, it would manage non-Treaty storage until 2024.

Climate 

Pumped storage 
Kinbasket Lake above Mica Dam normally has unused capacity to store water and Revelstoke Lake below the dam has minimal storage capacity. A proposed pumped storage addition on the side of Mica Dam would pump water into Kinbasket Lake, which would later be used to generate power at Mica and Revelstoke dams. This project was discussed in 2017 as storage for intermittent power from wind turbines in the event that the Site C Dam was cancelled.

See also 

 List of largest power stations in Canada
 List of generating stations in British Columbia
 List of dams in the Columbia River watershed
 Hydroelectric dams on the Columbia River
 Revelstoke Dam
 Keenleyside Dam

References

External links 

Dams on the Columbia River
Dams in British Columbia
Hydroelectric power stations in British Columbia
Columbia Country
Dams completed in 1973
Embankment dams
Underground power stations
BC Hydro
Publicly owned dams in Canada